Seagraves is a city in Gaines County, Texas, United States. Its population was 2,417 at the 2010 census.

History
A post office at the home of S.J. Blythe occupied the area known as Blythe, Texas. In 1917, the Santa Fe Railroad moved into the vicinity, but the rail company ran into a problem. Santa Fe already had one town by that name located in Blythe, California. The company decided to change the name of this new location to honor Charles L. Seagraves, an employee who worked as a traveling agent and was favored by local residents. The Spearman Land Company building was the first to be erected, and the Higginbotham Bartlett Lumber Company followed shortly thereafter. Seagraves grew rapidly as a town, and in 1928, suffered a fire that burned a major portion of the business section. The only building left standing on the west side of Main Street was the Seagraves Motor Company, which led to the rebuilding of modern brick buildings, many of which remain today.

Geography

Demographics

2020 census

As of the 2020 United States census,  2,153 people, 730 households, and 528 families were residing in the city.

2000 census
As of the census of 2000, 2,334 people, 812 households, and 616 families resided in the city. The population density was 1,609.8 people per square mile (621.5/km). The 977 housing units had an average density of 673.9/sq mi (260.2/km). The racial makeup of the city was 66.80% White, 6.08% African American, 0.73% Native American, 0.04% Asian, 23.31% from other races, and 3.04% from two or more races. Hispanics or Latinos of any race were 55.91% of the population.

Of 812 households, 39.4% had children under 18 living with them, 60.7% were married couples living together, 10.6% had a female householder with no husband present, and 24.1% were not families. About 22.5% of all households were made up of individuals, and 11.8% had someone living alone who was 65 or older. The average household size was 2.87, and the average family size was 3.40.

In the city, the population was distributed as 32.8% under 18, 8.7% from 18 to 24, 25.4% from 25 to 44, 20.2% from 45 to 64, and 12.9% who were 65 or older. The median age was 32 years. For every 100 females, there were 95.3 males. For every 100 females age 18 and over, there were 93.0 males.

The median income for a household in the city was $26,929, and for a family was $30,707. Males had a median income of $27,944 versus $16,181 for females. The per capita income for the city was $12,253. About 22.3% of families and 25.6% of the population were below the poverty line, including 31.8% of those under 18 and 22.0% of those 65 or over.

Education
The City of Seagraves is served by the Seagraves Independent School District and home to the Seagraves High School Eagles.

References

Cities in Gaines County, Texas
Cities in Texas